The 2020 Indiana Republican presidential primary was held on June 2, 2020 along with seven other Republican presidential primaries that day. All 58 of Indiana's delegates to the 2020 Republican National Convention were allocated according to the results. 

Donald Trump won the primary and all of the state's delegates.

Results

References

Indiana
Republican
Indiana Republican primaries